Kenneth Harding may refer to:

 Kenneth R. Harding (1914–2007), Sergeant at Arms of the United States House of Representatives
 Kenneth Harding (sportsman) (1892–1977), English cricketer and rugby union player
 Kenneth Harding (composer), composer of viola compositions, see List of compositions for viola: F to H
 A pseudonym of Paul Little